Ernest de Sélincourt (1870–1943) was a British literary scholar and critic, the eldest son of Charles Alexandre De Sélincourt and Theodora Bruce Bendall. He is best known as an editor of William Wordsworth and Dorothy Wordsworth.  He was an Oxford Professor of Poetry from 1928 to 1933 and a Fellow of University College, Oxford. After a distinguished career at Oxford, he became a Professor of English at Birmingham. Early in his career he taught in the Ladies' Department of King's College London, where his students included Virginia Woolf (then Virginia Stephen).

His papers are held at the University of Birmingham Special Collections.

De Sélincourt went to France in March 1917 as a professor with the YMCA and this service is duly recorded in the First World War medal rolls. He married Ethel Shawcross in 1896 in the Battle, Sussex, registration District. At the time of the 1911 census they had four children. She died in Oxford in 1931.

Works
 The Poetical Works of Edmund Spenser (1910) editor, three volumes
 English poets and the national ideal – four lectures (1915)
 The Poems of John Keats (1920) editor
  (1921 Warton Lecture on English Poetry)
 Guide to the Lakes by William Wordsworth (1926) editor
 The Prelude, or Growth of a Poet's Mind by William Wordsworth (1928) editor
 Journals of Dorothy Wordsworth (1933) editor
 Dorothy Wordsworth (1933)
 Oxford Lectures on Poetry (1934)
 The Letters of William and Dorothy Wordsworth – 6 Volumes (1935–39) editor, six volumes
Recollections of a Tour Made in Scotland (1941), editor (by Dorothy Wordsworth)

References

External links
 

1870 births
1943 deaths
British literary critics
20th-century British writers
Fellows of University College, Oxford
Oxford Professors of Poetry
Academics of the University of Birmingham